Rachna Malayalam is considered as the first computer operating system in Malayalam language and the first such system in a regional language in India. It was launched on February 16, 2006.

The operating system, developed by four people in Kerala, is in the Linux platform and is an open software.

References 

2006 software
Language-specific Linux distributions
Malayalam language
Linux distributions